George Federico (born 21 September 1957) is a Gibraltarian professional darts player who has played in Professional Darts Corporation (PDC) events.

Darts career
Federico qualified for the 1994 Winmau World Masters he lost to Steve Beaton by whitewash 2–0 in the first round.

Federico winner of the 2000 Gibraltar Open he beating by Spain's Antonio Munoz Ramos.

Federico qualified for the 2013 Gibraltar Darts Trophy he lost to Steve Beaton and 2016 he lost to Alan Norris on the PDC European Tour, but lost in the first round on both occasions.

References

External links

Gibraltarian darts players
1957 births
Living people
Professional Darts Corporation associate players